Talamancalia is a genus of flowering plant in the family Asteraceae. 
It contains the following species:
 Talamancalia boquetensis (Standl.) H. Rob. & Cuatrec.
 Talamancalia westonii H.Rob. & Cuatrec.

Synonyms:
 Talamancalia fosbergii (Cuatrec.) B.Nord. = Lomanthus fosbergii (Cuatrec.) B.Nord. & Pelser 
 Talamancalia putcalensis (Hieron.) B.Nord. & J.F. Pruski = Lomanthus putcalensis (Hieron.) B.Nord. 
 Talamancalia westonii H. Rob. & Cuatrec. = Pseudogynoxys westonii (H. Rob. & Cuatrec.) B.L. Turner 
 Pseudogynoxys boquetensis (Standl.) B.L. Turner = Talamancalia boquetensis (Standl.) H. Rob. & Cuatrec. 
 Senecio boquetensis Standl.  = Talamancalia boquetensis (Standl.) H. Rob. & Cuatrec.

References

 
Asteraceae genera
Taxonomy articles created by Polbot